Andrew Patalan (born March 14, 1970) is an American musician best known as the guitarist and backing vocalist for the alternative rock band Sponge. He also is a founding member of Solid Frog and Throttlebody.  He was also the guitarist for Brownsville Station from 2011–2013.  His brother Tim Patalan is the bassist and producer of Sponge.  He is the owner of his home studio, ATP Productions in Shelby Township, Michigan, and he is the co-owner of The Loft Recording Studio in Saline, Michigan.

Personal life
Patalan grew up on a farm in Saline, Michigan with his brother Tim.  One of the barns on this farm was later turned into his recording studio called The Loft Recording Studio, which he is the co-owner of along with his brother, and has been the studio for recording over 500 bands since 1988.

Sponge
Patalan joined Sponge in 2004, after a major line-up change in the band.  He and guitarist that was in Patalan's other bands, Kyle Neely joined after former guitarists Joey Mazzola and Kurt Marschke left the band, making singer Vinnie Dombroski the only original member.  Although Patalan was new to the guitar role in Sponge, he was very familiar with the band.  He was the assistant engineer for the Sponge albums Rotting Piñata (1994), Wax Ecstatic (1996), and New Pop Sunday (1999).  His first album with Sponge while playing guitar is the 2005 EP Hard to Keep My Cool.  His first studio album with Sponge is The Man from 2005.  Patalan's first live album with Sponge was released in 2007, called Alive in Detroit, this was also Sponge's first live album ever.  His second studio album with Sponge was the 2007 release Galore Galore.  Patalan's second EP with Sponge, Destroy the Boy was released in 2010.  In 2013 Sponge participated in the Summerland Tour.  This was a tour with Filter, LIVE, and Everclear.  On this tour is where the newest Sponge album, Stop the Bleeding was first released on Three One Three Records, the album was only available at Summerland shows.  It was later announced that Sponge signed to The End Records to release the album nationally in September 2013.

Solid Frog
Solid Frog is a Detroit-based grunge band in which Patalan is the lead singer and guitarist of. Two albums have been released by this band, Supercoat (1995) and Pepperspray (1997).  They got some airplay on radio stations, especially the song "Standard Day".  The second album also received some airplay, but not as much as the first one.

Brownsville Station
Patalan joined the rock band Brownsville Station in 2011.  Brownsville Station is most remembered for their 1973 hit single Smokin' in the Boys Room.  He briefly played guitar and sang before he left the band in 2013.  He recorded one album with the band.

Throttlebody
Throttlebody is a band made up of three members of Solid Frog. Andy Patalan, Kyle Neely, and Mike Purcell formed Throttlebody and released a self-titled album in 2002.

Contributions to other bands
Patalan has worked with a number of other bands and recording artists. When he is not playing one of the many instruments that he plays (guitar, percussion, bass guitar, piano, or vocals), he often works as a mixer, producer or sound engineer.

Acting
Patalan has appeared as himself on TV shows such as The Late Late Show with Craig Kilborn, The View, The Wayne Brady Show, and Cold Pizza. He also appeared on All My Children performing songs with Bob Guiney.  Patalan has also composed music for TV shows and documentaries such as Chasing Jimmy! and Denton Rose's Shorts.

References

Further reading

External links
 The Loft Recording
 

1970 births
Living people
Guitarists from Ohio
People from Lorain, Ohio
People from Saline, Michigan
Musicians from Michigan
American male guitarists
21st-century American guitarists
21st-century American male musicians